Andrejs Žagars (16 October 1958 – 26 February 2019) was a Latvian actor, opera director, entrepreneur and politician. He was head of the Latvian National Opera from 1996 to 2013. His brother Juris Žagars also is an actor and since 2019 director of Riga Daile Theater.

References

1958 births
2019 deaths
People from Chernogorsk
For Latvia's Development politicians
Latvian actors
Latvian directors
Latvian businesspeople
Recipients of the Order of the Cross of Terra Mariana, 3rd Class